In the Late Post-Classic Maya mythology of the Popol Vuh, Camazotz ( from Mayan ) (alternate spellings Cama-Zotz, Sotz, Zotz) is a bat spirit at the service of the lords of the underworld. Camazotz means "death bat" in the Kʼicheʼ language. In Mesoamerica generally, the bat is often associated with night, death, and sacrifice.

Etymology
Camazotz is formed from the Kʼicheʼ words kame, meaning "death", and sotz''', meaning "bat".

Mythology
In the Popol Vuh, Camazotz are the bat-like spirits encountered by the Maya Hero Twins Hunahpu and Xbalanque during their trials in the underworld of Xibalba. The twins had to spend the night in the House of Bats, where they squeezed themselves into their own blowguns in order to defend themselves from the circling bats. Hunahpu stuck his head out of his blowgun to see if the sun had risen and Camazotz immediately snatched off his head and carried it to the ballcourt to be hung up as the ball to be used by the gods in their next ballgame.

 Classic Period (200-900CE) 
In Classic Maya iconography, the (leaf-nosed) bat, exhaling unhealthy vapours, is often depicted as a person's nahual or way-spirit bringing disease over an enemy. However, the Classic bat spirit is rarely, if ever, part of a narrative context, nor does it appear to play the role assigned to it by the Popol Vuh.

 In popular culture 
Camazotz is a playable god in the free downloadable video game Smite, where his title is "The Deadly God of Bats".
He's a changed hero in Maya and the Three, having rebelled against Lord Mictlan the Evil.
Goth, a spectral bat and descendant of Cama Zotz is the primary antagonist of Kenneth Oppel's Silverwing series.
Camazotz appears in Victor and Valentino.
Camazotz is the name of the planet consumed by darkness in A Wrinkle in Time, a book by Madeleine L'Engle.
Camazotz serves as one of the main villains of the Storm Runner trilogy of novels by J. C. Cervantes, part of the Rick Riordan Presents imprint.
Camazotz appears in Legendary Pictures's MonsterVerse franchise in the graphic novel Kingdom Kong, where he is a giant bat-like Titan from the Hollow Earth commanding a large group of bat-like creatures dubbed the "Hell Swarm."
Camazotz is a Beast-class servant in Fate/Grand Order'' mobile game, where he appears in Nahui-Mictlan Lostbelt

See also
 Leutogi, mythological Polynesian bat goddess
 Mayans M.C.#Episodes (Season 2 episode 3: "Camazotz")
 The Minyades - three sisters in Greek mythology who were turned into bats and owls
 Nyctimene (mythology)
 Batman

References

Bibliography
 Brady, James E., and Jeremy D. Coltman, Bats and the Camazotz: Correcting a Century of Mistaken Identity. Latin-American Antiquity 27(2) 2016: 227-237.

 
 
 
 
 

Bats and humans
Batman
Characters from the Popol Vuh
Death gods
Evil deities
Fictional bats
Legendary mammals
Maya gods
Underworld gods
Bats in religion